The 2013–14 season is the club's 105th season, having been founded as Dundee Hibernian in 1909 and their first season in the Scottish Premiership. United will also compete in the League Cup and the Scottish Cup.

Results & fixtures

Pre season

Scottish Premiership

Scottish League Cup

Dundee United entered the competition in the second round and were drawn against Scottish Championship side Dumbarton. They won the tie 3-2 and progressed to face fellow Scottish Premiership team Partick Thistle in the third round. They defeated Partick Thistle 4-1 with David Goodwillie scoring a hat-trick but then lost to Inverness Caledonian Thistle in the quarter-finals.

Scottish Cup

Dundee United entered the Scottish Cup in the fourth round and came from behind to defeat Kilmarnock 5-2 to progress to the next stage. They followed this up with wins against St Mirren and Inverness Caledonian Thistle to reach the semi-finals. They were drawn to face Rangers at Ibrox as the usual venue, Hampden Park, was being redeveloped for the 2014 Commonwealth Games. United were unhappy with this as they felt the game should be played a neutral venue, as is usually the case for semi-finals, but their request to move the game elsewhere was rejected. In spite of this, United went on to win 3-1 and faced St Johnstone in the final. Demand for tickets was high with over 28,000 being sold, but the large support was ultimately left disappointed as United lost 2-0.

Player statistics

Squad information
Last updated 6 June 2014

|}

Disciplinary record
Includes all competitive matches.
Last updated 6 June 2014

Team statistics

League table

Division summary

Transfers

Players in

Players out

References

Dundee United
2013andndash;14